Varde Municipality is a municipality (Danish, kommune) in Region of Southern Denmark on the west coast of the Jutland peninsula in southwest Denmark. Its mayor is Erik Buhl Nielsen, a member of the Venstre (Liberal Party) political party. The main town and site of its municipal council is the town of Varde. It covers an area of 1255.79 km2 with a population of 49,664 (2022).

On 1 January 2007 Varde municipality was, as a result of Kommunalreformen ("The Municipal Reform" of 2007), merged with the existing Blaabjerg, Blåvandshuk, most of Helle (Grimstrup parish, a part of the former Helle Municipality, merged with Esbjerg Municipality), and Ølgod municipalities to form a new Varde municipality. Årre is also located in Varde.

Locations

Politics
Varde's municipal council consists of 25 members, elected every four years. The municipal council has six political committees.

Municipal council
Below are the municipal councils elected since the Municipal Reform of 2007.

References 

 Municipal statistics: NetBorger Kommunefakta, delivered from KMD aka Kommunedata (Municipal Data)
 Municipal mergers and neighbors: Eniro new municipalities map

External links 

 Municipality's official website
 Varde portal
 Varde Official Tourist Information
 Varde Attractions - museums and other sites of interest in Varde

 
Municipalities of the Region of Southern Denmark
Municipalities of Denmark
Populated places established in 2007